Uttam Kumar and Soumitra Chatterjee is the most awarded actors of all time with 8 wins, followed by Prosenjit Chatterjee (6), Sabyasachi Chakraborty (2), Mithun Chakraborty (2), Utpal Dutt (2) and Victor Banerjee (2). 
Here is a list of the award winners and the films for which they won.

See also

 Bengal Film Journalists' Association Awards
 Cinema of India

References

External links
 BJFA Awards website

Bengal Film Journalists' Association Awards